Kremberk is a settlement in the Slovene Hills in the Municipality of Sveta Ana in northeastern Slovenia.

References

External links
Kremberk on Geopedia

Populated places in the Municipality of Sveta Ana